Air Vice Marshal E. P. B. Liyanage, CEng, psc, MRAeS, FIE (SL) is a retired officer of the Sri Lanka Air Force, who was the former Director of General Engineering and Director of Inspection and Safety.

Early life
He received his education from Nalanda College Colombo and joined the Sri Lanka Air Force in 1978 as an officer cadet, severing till his retirement in 2009. Having competed in the Engineering Council Examination, United Kingdom he gained a MSc in Defense and Strategic Studies from the University of Madras and a MBA from the University of Colombo. A Charted Engineer, he was made a 'fellow' of the Institution of Engineers, Sri Lanka and is a member of the Royal Aeronautical Society. In 2006 he was promoted to the rank of Air Vice Marshal.

After retirement he is currently working as the Deputy Director Airworthiness for the Civil Aviation Authority of Sri Lanka.

References 

Past Commandants / Commanding Officers

CAA Staff List

Sri Lanka Airforce Annual Performance Report

Federal Air Marshal Careers

Living people
Sri Lanka Air Force air vice-marshals
Sinhalese military personnel
Sinhalese engineers
Alumni of Nalanda College, Colombo
Year of birth missing (living people)